Stigmella sakhalinella is a moth of the family Nepticulidae. It is found from Scandinavia to the Pyrenees, Italy and Serbia, and from Great Britain to central Russia, east to the eastern part of the Palearctic realm. It is also found in the Near East.

The wingspan is 4-4.6 mm. Adults are on wing in May and again from July to August.

The larvae feed on Betula pendula, Betula pubescens and Betula utilis. They mine the leaves of their host plant. The mine consists of a slender gallery. The corridor mostly begins close to the leaf margin, often near the tip of the leaf. The frass fills most of the width of the corridor, but always leaves a transparent zone at either side. Pupation takes place outside of the mine.

External links
Fauna Europaea
bladmineerders.nl

Nepticulidae
Moths of Europe
Moths of Asia
Moths described in 1984